Alexandra Bridge  may refer to:

Bridges
 Alexandra bridges, the old and new bridges over the Clutha River in Alexandra, New Zealand
 Alexandra Bridge, over the Ottawa River between Gatineau and Ottawa, Canada
 Alexandra Bridge (Trans-Canada), over the Fraser River near Spuzzum, British Columbia, Canada
Two earlier bridges in Alexandra Bridge Provincial Park
 Alexandra Railway Bridge, over the Fitzroy River in Rockhampton, Queensland, Australia 
 Alexandra Footbridge, a listed buildings in Tain, Highland, Scotland

Places
 Alexandra Bridge, Western Australia

See also

Queen Alexandra Bridge in north-east England